Sakuu is an American battery manufacturer founded in 2016 that produces lithium metal batteries through additive manufacturing technologies. Using a 3D printing platform, Sakuu manufactures batteries in custom shapes, sizes, and compositions. The company opened a battery printing and engineering facility in August 2022. In 2023, Sakuu announced it would merge with a special purpose acquisition company (SPAC) to be listed on a US stock exchange.

References 

American companies established in 2016
Electric vehicle battery manufacturers
Battery manufacturers